Grigorije Račanin (Serbian: Григорије Рачанин; Bajina Bašta, Serbia, after 1668 - Szentendre, Habsburg monarchy, after 1739) was a Serbian monk and writer. He is best remembered  for his travelogue on rafting in the Balkans in 1739. He was a contemporary of Gavrilo Stefanović Venclović, also a member of the Rača monastery and its literary School of Rača.

A copy of his major work -- Dravom i Dunavom od Osijeka do Krajove u Rumuniji—is archived in the Narodna biblioteka Srbije (National Library of Serbia) in Belgrade. The original manuscript is now lost, though a copy  testifies to the existence of a travelogue manuscript written by him after taking a trip along the "Drava and Danube from Osijek to Krajova in Romania" and back in 1739 as the title suggests.

Monk Grigorije Račanin lived and worked in the scriptorium of the old Rača monastery in Bajina Bašta before settling in Szentendre.

Works
 Dravom I Dunavom od Osijeka to Krajove u Ruminiji, 1739 
 Panonijom s krstom račanskim, vol.I-III
 Religious and secular texts.

See also
 Jerotej Račanin
 Kiprijan Račanin
 Ćirjak Račanin
 Simeon Račanin
 Teodor Račanin
 Hristifor Račanin
 Prohor Račanin
 Gavrilo Stefanović Venclović
Jefrem Janković Tetovac

References

Sources
 

Year of birth uncertain
Year of death uncertain
1660s births
1730s deaths
Serbian travel writers
People from Bajina Bašta
Serbian monks
People from Szentendre
18th-century Serbian writers
18th-century Christian monks